NGC 62 is a barred spiral galaxy in the constellation Cetus. NGC 62 is its New General Catalogue designation. It has an apparent magnitude of 13.2.

Discovery
NGC 62 was discovered by Édouard Stephan from France on 8 October 1883.

References

External links
 

0062
001125
Spiral galaxies
18831008
Cetus (constellation)